The Parnitha Funitel on Mont Parness is the successor of an aerial tramway constructed in the 1970s to serve Casino Mont Parnes, the most popular casino in the Athens area, located on one of the peaks of mount Parnitha. Also, it was a common way for Athenians to reach on the peak for family day trips, a popular habit even today.

However, since April 2006, a newly built funitel, replacing the older one, was launched and it continues serving its previous purposes. Note, that it was not only a renovation, but a full construction on the place where the older funitel installation once used to be.

Details of the old, demolished Casino Mont Parnes aerial tramway
Year of Construction: 1972
Line Length: 1,690 metres (~5,545 ft)
Average Inclination: 20 degrees (36%)
Max. Velocity: 7.0 m/s
Number of Cars: 2
Capacity of Cars: 30 passengers
Total Max. Transfer Ability: 280 passengers/hour
Conductors: 3
Engines: 1 x 194 kW (1 x 260 PS) 
Manufacturer: Habbeger AG

Details of the new Regency Casino Mont Parnes Funitel
Year of Construction: 2004
Line Length: 1,595 metres (~5,233 ft)
Average Inclination: 20 degrees (36%)
Max. Velocity: 6.0 m/s (~22 km/h)
Number of Cars: 24 (21 in public use, 2 for VIP personalities, 1 for line maintenance)
Capacity of public cars: 20 seats/car
Capacity of VIP cars: 6 seats/car
Total Max. Transfer Ability: 2,000 passengers/hour
Conductors: 3
Engines: 2 x 411 kW (2 x 559 PS) 
Transfer Time: ~5 minutes
Wind Speed Limit: 120 km/h
Total Cost: ~12 million euros
Manufacturer: Doppelmayr Seilbahnen S.A.

Cable cars in Greece
Transport in Athens